Mobile porn, also known as mobile adult content, mobile erotica or cellphone adult content, is pornography transmitted over mobile telecommunications networks for consumption on mobile devices (mainly mobile phones, tablets and smartphones).

History 

Just like the internet and pay TV, the adult entertainment industry was one of the first forms of mass media to embrace mobile devices as a new means to distribute content. During 2002, Private Media Group became the first adult media company to employ a dedicated mobile specialist. This initiative led to the industry's first adult SMS services, erotic mobile content distribution and mobile internet (WAP) site, called "Private Mobile", offering a small range of videos directly to their consumers. This service was intended for the increasing range of Private consumers using feature phones in Europe with colour screens.

From the mid-2000s onwards, many mobile network operators eventually deployed age verification systems and industry-regulated explicitness grading levels that gradually allowed mobile erotica to be legally purchased through gated mobile operator portal communities only by consenting adults.

With the onset of smartphones in 2007 and portable tablet computers thereafter, more and more consumers in developed markets have since left these gated mobile operator communities and now browse the internet on their mobile and apps instead for their mobile erotica.

Widespread adoption of Apple's iPhone was initially expected to encourage growth in the mobile erotica industry. Following the release of the original iPhone in 2007, the search term "iPhone Porn" spiked considerably in popularity. with 37% of iPhone users watching video on their iPhone  However, Apple chairman Steve Jobs made it clear that no adult content would ever be sold from Apple's App Store, and thousands of adult apps have been banned on the App Store. However, Apple's ban on adult apps has been criticized as being impractical and ineffective.

Other companies in the mobile and video industries situated themselves to take advantage of this trend. Google built a new phone system called Google Play that supports any application within reasonable decency guidelines. Since then, dedicated adult-only app stores like MiKandi and other mobile internet publishers have benefited from this gap in the market instead.

Following its inception in 2002, the mobile erotica business was expected to grow to a market value of $2.3 billion within its first eight years.

North America 

The North American mobile erotica market differs from Europe in that carriers were slow to allow adult sites to use their subscriber payment mechanisms such as SMS, slowing market growth. Alternate business models involve offering free videos in the 'tube' style of websites with advertising funding. For the cost of viewing an ad, users can get free video clips.

Verizon Wireless and Sprint Nextel Corporation announced as late as 2008 that they would allow some adult content to be viewed on their networks, while working to prevent access to this content by children.  There have been expectations for some time that these companies will overcome age-verification, political, and religious challenges that have become a barrier to this market, to take advantage of the resulting increase in mobile web-surfing on their networks.

Criticisms

There has been some criticism of mobile porn, namely the exposure of children to inappropriate and unregulated content. However, most mobile network operators have implemented age verification systems, which require that customers who want to buy porn through their phone legally prove that they are a consenting adult first.

Sony, the company which created the PlayStation Portable (PSP), say that they are unhappy with the spread of PSP porn, but claim to be unable to stop its spread.

See also
MiKandi
Private Media Group

References

Pornography by genre
Mobile content